Calcium bromate, Ca(BrO3)2, is a calcium salt of bromic acid. It is most commonly encountered as the monohydrate, Ca(BrO3)2•H2O.

It can be prepared by reacting calcium hydroxide with sodium bromate or calcium sulfate with barium bromate.  Above 180 °C, calcium bromate decomposes to form calcium bromide and oxygen. In theory, electrolysis of calcium bromide solution will also yield calcium bromate.

It is used as a bread dough and flour "improver" or conditioner (E number E924b) in some countries.

References

Calcium compounds
Bromates
Oxidizing agents